Sancak may refer to:

 Sanjak, an administrative unit of the Ottoman Empire
 Sandžak, a historical region in Serbia and Montenegro

People
 Sancak Kaplan (born 1982), Turkish footballer
 Yasin Sancak (born 1978), Turkish volleyball player

Turkish-language surnames
Turkish masculine given names